Atashi is a Persian surname that may refer to the following notable people:
Ali Faidh Atashi (born 1996), Qatari football player
Enayatollah Atashi (born 1946), Iranian basketball coach
Manouchehr Atashi (1931–2006), Iranian poet
Mehrad Atashi (born 1995), Iranian basketball player
Zeidan Atashi (born 1940), Israeli diplomat of Druze descent

See also
Japanese pronouns

Arabic-language surnames